The Tarcău is a right tributary of the river Bistrița in Romania. It discharges into the Bistrița in the village Tarcău. It flows through the villages Ardeluța, Schitu Tarcău, Brateș, Cazaci and Tarcău.

The Hungarian name means "baldstone". The Romanian name derives from that.

Tributaries

The following rivers are tributaries to the river Tarcău:

Left: Țapu, Tărcuța, Ardeluța, Răchita, Bolovăniș, Măierușu, Brateș, Ața, Râul Cheii, Valea Bătrâna, Cazaci, Frasinu
Right: Răchitiș, Goșmanu, Dumitru, Cichiva, Murgoci, Pașcu, Radu, Hermanu

References

Rivers of Romania
Rivers of Neamț County